Joanne Marie Platt (born 15 June 1973) is a British Labour and Co-operative politician who served as the Member of Parliament (MP) for Leigh from 2017 to 2019. She served on the opposition front bench as a Shadow Cabinet Office Minister from 2018 to 2019.

Political career
Platt was elected to Astley Mosley Common ward on Wigan Council at the 2012 local elections and re-elected in 2016. She was appointed as the Cabinet Member for Children and Young People in June 2014, and also served as the Secretary of the Leigh Constituency Labour Party during her tenure on the council. Platt resigned her council seat shortly after her election to Parliament in 2017.

Parliamentary career 
Platt was elected as the first female MP for Leigh at the 2017 General Election, succeeding Andy Burnham who stood down following his election as Greater Manchester Mayor. Upon election, Platt advocated greater investment for post-industrial towns, restoring rail connectivity, increased local post-16 education provision and highlighting opportunities arising from devolution.

Platt was a briefly member of the Environment, Food and Rural Affairs Committee in 2017, but sat on the Housing, Communities and Local Government Committee from 2017 to 2018.

Platt was appointed as the Parliamentary Private Secretary (PPS) to Angela Rayner, Shadow Education Secretary, in July 2017. She held the position until July 2018, when she was promoted as a Shadow Minister for the Cabinet Office, focusing on cybersecurity, government digital projects, digital identity, outsourcing and government implementation. She criticised the Government's cybersecurity record in her role, as well as their handling of Huawei's involvement in the UK's 5G infrastructure. In March 2019, Platt advocated having a single Cybersecurity Minister and a government approach that facilitates the growth of the UK cyber sector in post-industrial towns. She also advocated the uptake of the cyber profession amongst those with neurodiverse conditions.

Platt set up and chaired the All Party Parliamentary Group on attention deficit hyperactivity disorder, informing and advising Ministers of the barriers those with ADHD face and the change that is required. In August 2018, she asked every clinical commissioning group (CCG) across the country what their average waiting time for ADHD diagnosis was, ultimately revealing some were waiting an average of two years for a diagnosis. She presented the findings to Prime Minister Theresa May during Prime Minister's Questions, securing a commitment from her to explore whether waiting times could be published to encourage a better diagnosis and treatment.

Platt lost her seat at the 2019 general election to the Conservative Party candidate, James Grundy. The result saw the largest 2017 majority for a party overturned in the country, and was the first time Labour lost the seat since 1922.

In 2022, Platt was selected as the prospective parliamentary candidate for Leigh at the next general election.

Personal 
Platt has two children. Since leaving Parliament Platt has  worked for the charity Leigh Building Preservation Trust, at a local heritage site Leigh Spinners which is a Grade II* listed mill in the centre of Leigh. Platt is tasked with the management of renovating the building to house heritage, small business, enterprise, arts and culture. Whilst at Leigh Spinners Mill, she has co-created a Co-operatives UK company, Leigh Spinners CBS, in order to drive further development for the site.  Platt continues to campaign on local and national issues such as Long COVID, after contracting the virus in March 2020.

References

External links

1973 births
UK MPs 2017–2019
Labour Co-operative MPs for English constituencies
21st-century British women politicians
Female members of the Parliament of the United Kingdom for English constituencies
Living people
Members of the Parliament of the United Kingdom for Leigh
21st-century English women
21st-century English people